The Houston Astros' 1994 season was a season in American baseball.  It involved the Houston Astros attempting to win the inaugural season of the National League Central division; they finished in second place.  First baseman Jeff Bagwell was a unanimous selection for the National League Most Valuable Player Award.  Despite nearly the last two months of the being cancelled due to the 1994–95 strike, Bagwell set a then-club record for home runs with 39 and a club record for batting average (.368) and slugging percentage (.750).

Offseason
 November 27, 1993: Xavier Hernandez was traded by the Astros to the New York Yankees for Andy Stankiewicz and Domingo Jean.
 December 2, 1993: Doug Jones and Jeff Juden were traded by Astros to the Philadelphia Phillies for Mitch Williams.
 December 10, 1993: Eric Anthony was traded by the Astros to the Seattle Mariners for Mike Felder and Mike Hampton.
 January 26, 1994: Sid Bream was signed as a free agent by the Astros.

Regular season
On June 24, Jeff Bagwell hit three home runs against the Los Angeles Dodgers at the Astrodome – two in the same inning – in a 16–4 rout, becoming the first Astro since Glenn Davis in 1990 to do so.  He was the NL Player of the Week for consecutive weeks on June 19 and June 26 and the NL Player of the Month for June, his second career monthly award.

Overview of Jeff Bagwell's unanimous Most Valuable Player Award season
Bagwell finished the 1994 season playing in 110 games and batting .368 with a .750 SLG, 1.201 OPS, 39 HR, 116 RBI, 104 runs scored, 300 total bases and 213 adjusted OPS (OPS+) in 400 at-bats. He led the major leagues in SLG, OPS+, RBI, and total bases, and the NL in runs scored and OPS, but fell short of winning the batting Triple Crown, finishing second for the batting title to Tony Gwynn, who, after batting .394, had the highest average in the major leagues since Ted Williams in 1941. Bagwell finished second in HR to Matt Williams, who hit 43. His .750 SLG at the time ranked as the seventh-best ever – it still ranks as the 11th best single-season mark in Major League history – and was the highest by a National Leaguer since Rogers Hornsby in 1925 (.756). He unanimously won the NL Most Valuable Player Award, becoming the fourth player in National League history to be unanimously voted the award, and the first Astros player to win the award. Bagwell also won his first Silver Slugger Award and Rawlings Gold Glove Award, and Player of the Year Awards from the Associated Press, Baseball Digest, and USA Today Baseball Weekly.

At the time, in National League history, the 213 OPS+ trailed only Hornsby's 1924 season (222 OPS+) for the second-highest ever; as of 2015, it was tied for 24th highest of all time in all major league seasons, and was the eighth highest among all not by Barry Bonds, Babe Ruth or Williams.  Bagwell generated a .383 Isolated Power (ISO) mark, the 16th-highest in history.  Twelve of the 15 higher seasons belonged to Bonds, Ruth, and Mark McGwire.  Seven of the ten seasons that exceeded his .750 SLG belonged to Bonds and Ruth.  Bagwell's 10.26 at bats per home run (AB/HR) ratio is the 25th-best in history.  The 1.2009 OPS is the 20th-highest in history; 13 of the seasons that are higher belong to Bonds, Ruth and Williams.  The 116 RBI in 110 games qualified for the 13th-highest ratio in history.

Projecting Bagwell's totals to 162 games and 650 plate appearances, he was on pace to amass 47 doubles, 57 home runs, 170 RBI, 22 stolen bases, 95 walks, 216 hits, along with .451 OBP, .750 SLG, and 1.201 OPS.   When leading off an inning, he batted .460, .514 OBP, .990 SLG, 1.504 OPS, 14 HR, nine doubles and a triple.  He also hit 23 home runs in 56 games at the Astrodome, setting a record that stood for the stadium that was famed to be pitcher-friendly until the Astros moved out following the 1999 season.  Bagwell's other totals in the Astrodome that season included a .373 batting average, 54 runs scored, 58 RBI, .816 SLG and 1.275 OPS.  In 125 plate appearances against left-handed pitching, he batted .457 with 20 BB, 18 HR and 11 doubles for a .544 OBP, 1.095 SLG and 1.639 OPS.  He set single-season club records for batting average, SLG, OPS, OPS+, AB/HR, and offensive win percentage (.858), and also for home runs, breaking Wynn's 27-year-old record, and RBI, breaking Bob Watson's record he had set 17 years earlier – later which he again both subsequently broke.

By Friday, August 12, the Astros had compiled a 66-49 record through 115 games. They were trailing the Cincinnati Reds by half a game for the NL Central Division lead and the Atlanta Braves by 2.5 games in the 1994 NL Wildcard Race. They had scored 602 runs (5.23 per game) and had allowed 503 runs (4.37 per game).

Offensively, the Astros led the Majors in doubles during the strike-shortened season (252) intentional walks (58) and sacrifice hits (73).

Game log

|-  style="text-align:center; background:#bfb;"
| 1 || April 4 || Expos || 6-5 (12 inn.) || Edens (1-0) || Shaw (0-1) || || 43,440 || 1-0 || Boxscore  
|-  style="text-align:center; background:#fbb;"
| 2 || April 5 || Expos || 1-5 || Hill (1-0) || Drabek (0-1) || || 16,227 || 1-1 || Boxscore  
|-  style="text-align:center; background:#fbb;"
| 3 || April 6 || Expos || 3-9 || Rueter (1-0) || Kile (0-1) || || 17,180 || 1-2 || Boxscore
|-
| 4 || April 8 || Mets
|-
| 5 || April 9 || Mets
|-
| 6 || April 10 || Mets
|-
| 7 || April 12 || @ Marlins
|-
| 8 || April 13 || @ Marlins
|-
| 9 || April 14 || @ Marlins
|-
| 10 || April 15 || @ Mets
|-
| 11 || April 16 || @ Mets
|-
| 12 || April 17 || @ Mets
|-
| 13 || April 19 || @ Cubs
|-
| 14 || April 20 || @ Cubs
|-
| 15 || April 22 || @ Cardinals
|-
| 16 || April 23 || @ Cardinals
|-
| 17 || April 24 || @ Cardinals
|-
| 18 || April 25 || Pirates
|-
| 19 || April 26 || Pirates
|-
| 20 || April 27 || Cubs
|-
| 21 || April 28 || Cubs
|-
| 22 || April 29 || Cardinals
|-
| 23 || April 30 || Cardinals
|-

|-
| 24 || May 1 || Cardinals
|-
| 25 || May 3 || @ Pirates
|-
| 26 || May 4 || @ Pirates
|-
| 27 || May 5 || @ Reds
|-
| 28 || May 6 || @ Reds
|-
| 29 || May 7 || @ Reds
|-
| 30 || May 8 || @ Reds
|-
| 31 || May 9 || @ Dodgers
|-
| 32 || May 10 || @ Dodgers
|-
| 33 || May 11 || @ Dodgers
|-
| 34 || May 13 || Rockies
|-
| 35 || May 14 || Rockies
|-
| 36 || May 15 || Rockies
|-
| 37 || May 16 || Giants
|-
| 38 || May 17 || Giants
|-
| 39 || May 18 || Giants
|-
| 40 || May 19 || Padres
|-
| 41 || May 20 || Padres
|-
| 42 || May 21 || Padres
|-
| 43 || May 22 || Padres
|-
| 44 || May 24 || @ Braves
|-
| 45 || May 25 || @ Braves
|-
| 46 || May 26 || @ Braves
|-
| 47 || May 27 || @ Phillies
|-
| 48 || May 28 || @ Phillies
|-
| 49 || May 29 || @ Phillies
|-
| 50 || May 30 || Marlins
|-
| 51 || May 31 || Marlins
|-

|-
| 52 || June 1 || Marlins
|-
| 53 || June 3 || Phillies
|-
| 54 || June 4 || Phillies
|-
| 55 || June 5 || Phillies
|-  style="text-align:center; background:#fbb;"
| 56 || June 6 || @ Expos || 5-10 || Henry (3-0) || Swindell (5-2) || Wetteland (8) || 14,322 || 32-24 || Boxscore
|-  style="text-align:center; background:#fbb;"
| 57 || June 7 || @ Expos || 2-3 || Heredia (2-2) || Veres (2-3) || Wetteland (9) || 17,283 || 32-25 || Boxscore
|-  style="text-align:center; background:#bfb;"
| 58 || June 8 || @ Expos || 9-2 || Williams (3-2) || Fassero (4-4) || || 17,289 || 33-25 || Boxscore
|-
| 59 || June 10 || Braves
|-
| 60 || June 11 || Braves
|-
| 61 || June 12 || Braves
|-
| 62 || June 13 || @ Giants
|-
| 63 || June 14 || @ Giants
|-
| 64 || June 15 || @ Giants
|-
| 65 || June 16 || @ Giants
|-
| 66 || June 17 || @ Padres
|-
| 67 || June 18 || @ Padres
|-
| 68 || June 19 || @ Padres
|-
| 69 || June 20 || @ Rockies
|-
| 70 || June 21 || @ Rockies
|-
| 71 || June 22 || @ Rockies
|-
| 72 || June 24 || Dodgers
|-
| 73 || June 25 || Dodgers
|-
| 74 || June 26 || Dodgers
|-
| 75 || June 27 || Reds
|-
| 76 || June 28 || Reds
|-
| 77 || June 29 || Reds
|-
| 78 || June 30 || Cubs
|-

|-
| 79 || July 1 || Cubs
|-
| 80 || July 2 || Cubs
|-
| 81 || July 3 || Cubs
|-
| 82 || July 4 || @ Cardinals
|-
| 83 || July 5 || @ Cardinals
|-
| 84 || July 6 || @ Cardinals
|-
| 85 || July 7 || @ Cubs
|-
| 86 || July 8 || @ Cubs
|-
| 87 || July 9 || @ Cubs
|-
| 88 || July 10 || @ Cubs
|-  style="text-align:center; background:#bbcaff;"
|align="center" colspan="10"|All-Star Break: NL def. AL at Three Rivers Stadium, 8–7 (10)
|-
| 89 || July 14 || @ Pirates
|-
| 90 || July 15 || @ Pirates
|-
| 91 || July 16 || @ Pirates
|-
| 92 || July 17 || @ Pirates
|-
| 93 || July 18 || Cardinals
|-
| 94 || July 19 || Cardinals
|-
| 95 || July 20 || Cardinals
|-
| 96 || July 21 || Pirates
|-
| 97 || July 22 || Pirates
|-
| 98 || July 23 || Pirates
|-
| 99 || July 24 || Pirates
|-
| 100 || July 25 || @ Reds
|-
| 101 || July 26 || @ Reds
|-
| 102 || July 27 || @ Reds
|-
| 103 || July 29 || @ Dodgers
|-
| 104 || July 30 || @ Dodgers
|-
| 105 || July 31 || @ Dodgers
|-

|-
| 106 || August 1 || Rockies
|-
| 107 || August 2 || Rockies
|-
| 108 || August 3 || Rockies
|-
| 109 || August 4 || Rockies
|-
| 110 || August 5 || Giants
|-
| 111 || August 6 || Giants
|-
| 112 || August 7 || Giants
|-
| 113 || August 9 || Padres
|-
| 114 || August 10 || Padres
|-
| 115 || August 11 || Padres
|-

Season standings

Record vs. opponents

Opening Day lineup

Notable transactions
 May 2, 1994: Mike Simms was signed as a free agent by the Astros.
 May 31, 1994: Mitch Williams was released by the Astros.
 June 2, 1994: Tony Mounce was drafted by the Astros in the 7th round of the 1994 Major League Baseball draft

Roster

Player stats

Batting

Starters by position
Note: Pos = Position; G = Games played; AB = At bats; H = Hits; Avg. = Batting average; HR = Home runs; RBI = Runs batted in

Other batters
Note: G = Games played; AB = At bats; H = Hits; Avg. = Batting average; HR = Home runs; RBI = Runs batted in

Pitching

Starting pitchers 
Note: G = Games pitched; IP = Innings pitched; W = Wins; L = Losses; ERA = Earned run average; SO = Strikeouts

Other pitchers 
Note: G = Games pitched; IP = Innings pitched; W = Wins; L = Losses; ERA = Earned run average; SO = Strikeouts

Relief pitchers 
Note: G = Games pitched; W = Wins; L = Losses; SV = Saves; ERA = Earned run average; SO = Strikeouts

Statistical achievements

National League individual leaders

Batting
 Adjusted on-base plus slugging: Jeff Bagwell (213)
 Doubles:  Craig Biggio (44)
 On-base plus slugging: Jeff Bagwell (1.201)
 Runs batted in: Jeff Bagwell (116)
 Runs scored: Jeff Bagwell (104)
 Slugging percentage: Jeff Bagwell (.750)
 Stolen bases: Craig Biggio (39)
 Total bases: Jeff Bagwell (300)

Pitching
 Bases on balls allowed: Darryl Kile (82)

Records
 Adjusted on-base plus slugging for Houston Astros: Jeff Bagwell (213)
 Batting average for Houston Astros: Jeff Bagwell (.368)
 Home runs hit at Astrodome in a season: Jeff Bagwell (23)
 On-base plus slugging for Houston Astros: Jeff Bagwell (1.201)

Awards and honors
 Major League Baseball All-Stars:
 Jeff Bagwell (1B)
 Craig Biggio (2B)
 Ken Caminiti (3B)
 Doug Drabek (P)
 National League Most Valuable Player: Jeff Bagwell
 National League Pitcher of the Month Award:  Doug Drabek (May)
 National League Player of the Month Award: 2× Jeff Bagwell (June & July)
 Rawlings Gold Glove Award:
 Jeff Bagwell (1B)
 Craig Biggio (2B)
 Silver Slugger Award:
 Jeff Bagwell (1B)
 Craig Biggio (2B)
 Sporting News Player of the Year Award: Jeff Bagwell

Farm system

LEAGUE CHAMPIONS: GCL Astros

References

External links
1994 Houston Astros season at Baseball Reference

Houston Astros seasons
Houston Astros season
Houston